Cyril Connell may refer to:

Cyril Connell, Snr. (1899–1974), former rugby league footballer, administrator and university registrar
Cyril Connell, Jr. (1928–2009), former rugby league five-eighth, former scout for Brisbane Broncos